The 1996 Tirreno–Adriatico was the 31st edition of the Tirreno–Adriatico cycle race and was held from 13 March to 20 March 1996. The race started in Fiuggi and finished in San Benedetto del Tronto. The race was won by Francesco Casagrande of the Saeco team.

General classification

References

1996
1996 in Italian sport